Trust Me is a British anthology medical drama that premiered on BBC One. The four-part first series aired in August 2017, and was written by Dan Sefton. In February 2018, the programme was renewed for a second series, which premiered on 16 April 2019. The series was cancelled in June 2019.

Hardacre, a nurse, who loses her job following whistle blowing, steals the identity of a doctor, her best friend, to make a new life in Edinburgh with her daughter.

In the second series, Syrian tour veteran Corporal James 'Jamie' McCain recovers from spinal injuries and psychological trauma in the neurological unit of South Lothian Hospital whilst facing a potential new enemy as patients unexpectedly die around him.

Cast

Series One 
 Jodie Whittaker as Cath Hardacre / Alison 'Ally' Sutton
 Emun Elliott as Dr. Andy Brenner
 Sharon Small as Dr. Brigitte Rayne
 Blake Harrison as Karl, Cath's ex-husband
 Nathan Welsh as Sam Kelly, a journalist
 Cara Kelly as Mona McBride
 Lois Chimimba as Nurse Karen
 Michael Abubakar as Dr. Charlie McKee
 Andrea Lowe as Dr. Alison Sutton

Series Two 
 Alfred Enoch as Jamie McCain
 Katie Clarkson-Hill as Dr. Zoe Wade
 John Hannah as Dr. Archie Watson
 Ashley Jensen as Debbie Dorrell
 Richard Rankin as Dr. Alex Kiernan

Production
On 23 February 2018, it was announced that Trust Me would return for a second series, featuring a new premise and an entirely new cast owing to Jodie Whittaker's casting as the Thirteenth Doctor in Doctor Who. The second series was set on the neurological unit of South Lothian Hospital, following Syrian tour veteran Corporal James 'Jamie' McCain as he recovers from spinal injuries and psychological trauma whilst facing a potential new enemy as patients unexpectedly die around him. The second series premiered on 16 April 2019. On 27 June 2019, the BBC confirmed that Trust Me had been cancelled.

Episodes

Series 1 (2017)

Series 2 (2019)

Notes

References

External links
 
 

2010s British crime television series
2010s British drama television series
2010s British medical television series
2017 British television series debuts
2019 British television series endings
BBC high definition shows
BBC television dramas
British crime drama television series
English-language television shows
Television series by Red Production Company
Television shows set in Edinburgh
Television shows set in Sheffield